Leucania is a genus of moths of the family Noctuidae first described by Ferdinand Ochsenheimer in 1816.

Description
Palpi obliquely upturned, where the second joint roughly scaled, and prominent, short, naked and depressed third joint. The proboscis is well developed. Its eyes are hairy. Antennae minutely ciliated in male. Head not deeply retracted into the thorax, which is smoothly scaled. Abdomen with scarcely a trace of dorsal tufts on basal segments. Tibia and tarsi with short hairs. Forewings with vein 8 and 9 anastomosing (fusing) to form the areole. Vein 7 being given off from the end of it. Vein 10 before the end.

Species

 Leucania abdominalis (Walker, 1856)
 Leucania acrapex (Hampson, 1905)
 Leucania adjuta (Grote, 1874)
 Leucania aedesiusi (Rougeot & Laporte, 1983)
 Leucania agnata (Draudt, 1950)
 Leucania albifasciata (Hampson, 1905)
 Leucania albimacula (Gaede, 1916)
 Leucania albistigma Moore, 1881
 Leucania albistriga Maassen, 1890
 Leucania alboradiata (Hampson, 1905)
 Leucania alopa Meyrick, 1887
 Leucania amens Guenée, 1852
 Leucania anteroclara Smith, 1902
 Leucania apparata Wallengren, 1875
 Leucania arcupunctata Maassen, 1890
 Leucania argyrina (Laporte, 1984)
 Leucania atrifera (Hampson, 1905)
 Leucania atrimacula Hampson, 1902
 Leucania atrinota (Hampson, 1905)
 Leucania atrisignata (Hampson, 1918)
 Leucania atritorna (Hampson, 1911)
 Leucania badia Maassen, 1890
 Leucania basilinea Swinhoe, 1890
 Leucania baziyae Möschler, 1883
 Leucania biforis (Draudt, 1924)
 Leucania bilinea Maassen, 1890
 Leucania bilineata (Hampson, 1905)
 Leucania bisetulata (Berio, 1940)
 Leucania brantsii Snellen, 1872
 Leucania calidior (Forbes, 1936)
 Leucania canariensis Rebel, 1894
 Leucania carminata (Hampson, 1918)
 Leucania carnea (Draudt, 1924)
 Leucania carneotincta (Kenrick, 1917)
 Leucania celebensis (Tams, 1935)
 Leucania chejela (Schaus, 1921)
 Leucania chilensis Butler, 1882
 Leucania cholica (Dyar, 1919)
 Leucania cinereicollis Walker, 1858
 Leucania clara (Draudt, 1924)
 Leucania clarescens Möschler, 1890
 Leucania clavifera (Hampson, 1907)
 Leucania comma (Linnaeus, 1761) – shoulder-striped wainscot
 Leucania commoides Guenée, 1852
 Leucania confluens (Bethune-Baker, 1909)
 Leucania confundens Walker, 1858
 Leucania continentalis Berio, 1962
 Leucania cooperi (Schaus, 1923)
 Leucania corrugata Hampson, 1894
 Leucania cruegeri Butler, 1886
 Leucania cupreata (Hampson, 1905)
 Leucania curvilinea Hampson, 1891
 Leucania cyprium (Laporte, 1984)
 Leucania dasycnema (Turner, 1912)
 Leucania dia (Grote, 1879)
 Leucania diagramma Bethune-Baker, 1905
 Leucania diatrecta Butler, 1886
 Leucania diopis (Hampson, 1905)
 Leucania dorsalis Walker, 1856
 Leucania ebriosa Guenée, 1852
 Leucania erecta Hreblay, 1999
 Leucania exclamans Berio, 1973
 Leucania extincta Guenée, 1852
 Leucania eyre (Schaus, 1938)
 Leucania ezrami (Schaus, 1938)
 Leucania fagani (Schaus, 1938)
 Leucania falklandica Butler, 1893
 Leucania farcta (Grote, 1881)
 Leucania fasilidasi (Laporte, 1984)
 Leucania februalis (Hill, 1924)
 Leucania ficta Walker, 1866
 Leucania fissifascia (Hampson, 1907)
 Leucania fiyu Hreblay & Yoshimatsu, 1998
 Leucania fortunata (Pinker, 1961)
 Leucania fragilis (Butler, 1883)
 Leucania guascana (Schaus, 1938)
 Leucania hamata Wallengren, 1856
 Leucania hartii Howes, 1914
 Leucania haywardi (Köhler, 1947)
 Leucania herrichii Herrich-Schäffer, [1849]
 Leucania hildrani (Schaus, 1938)
 Leucania homoeoptera (Hampson, 1918)
 Leucania humidicola Guenée, 1852
 Leucania hypocapna (de Joannis, 1932)
 Leucania imperfecta Smith, 1894
 Leucania impuncta Guenée, 1852
 Leucania inangulata (Gaede, 1934)
 Leucania incognita (Barnes & McDunnough, 1918)
 Leucania incompleta (Berio, 1970)
 Leucania inconspicua Herrich-Schäffer, 1868
 Leucania ineana Snellen, 1880
 Leucania ineata Snellen, 1880
 Leucania inermis (Forbes, 1936)
 Leucania infatuans Franclemont, 1972
 Leucania innotata Howes, 1908
 Leucania inouei Sugi, 1965
 Leucania insecuta Walker, 1865
 Leucania insueta Guenée, 1852
 Leucania insulicola Guenée, 1852
 Leucania interciliata Hampson, 1902
 Leucania internata Möschler, 1883
 Leucania irregularis (Walker, 1857)
 Leucania jaliscana Schaus, 1898
 Leucania joannisi Boursin & Rungs, 1952
 Leucania kathmandica Hreblay, Legrain & Yoshimatsu, 1996
 Leucania kirschi Maassen, 1890
 Leucania lacteola Christoph, 1893
 Leucania lacticinia (Dognin, 1914)
 Leucania lapidaria (Grote, 1876)
 Leucania latericia Holloway, 1979
 Leucania latiuscula Herrich-Schäffer, 1868
 Leucania leucogramma (Hampson, 1905)
 Leucania leucophlebia (Hampson, 1918)
 Leucania leucospila (Hampson, 1918)
 Leucania leucosta Lower, 1901
 Leucania leucostigma Snellen, 1877
 Leucania lewinii Butler, 1886
 Leucania lilloana (Köhler, 1947)
 Leucania lilloana (Köhler, 1947)
 Leucania linda Franclemont, 1952
 Leucania linearis Lucas, 1892
 Leucania lineolatoides Poole, 1989
 Leucania linita Guenée, 1852
 Leucania lobrega Adams, 2001
 Leucania longipennis (Hampson, 1905)
 Leucania loreyi (Duponchel, 1827)
 Leucania loreyimima Rungs, 1953 – sugar cane armyworm
 Leucania lucentia Maassen, 1890
 Leucania macellaria (Draudt, 1924)
 Leucania macoya (Schaus, 1921)
 Leucania mediolacteata (Berio, 1941)
 Leucania megaproctis (Hampson, 1905)
 Leucania melanostrota (Hampson, 1905)
 Leucania melianoides Möschler, 1884
 Leucania metasarca (Hampson, 1907)
 Leucania miasticta (Hampson, 1918)
 Leucania microgonia (Hampson, 1905)
 Leucania micropis (Hampson, 1905)
 Leucania microsticha (Hampson, 1905)
 Leucania misteca Schaus, 1898
 Leucania mocoides Dognin, 1897
 Leucania multilinea Walker, 1856
 Leucania multipunctata Druce, 1889
 Leucania murcida (Wallengren, 1875)
 Leucania musakensis Laporte, 1977
 Leucania nabalua Holloway, 1976
 Leucania nebulosa Hampson, 1902
 Leucania negrottoi (Berio, 1940)
 Leucania nigrispara Hampson, 1902
 Leucania nigristriga Hreblay, Legrain & Yoshimatsu, 1998
 Leucania noacki (Boursin, 1967)
 Leucania oaxacana Schaus, 1898
 Leucania obsoleta (Hübner, [1803])
 Leucania obumbrata T.P. Lucas, 1894
 Leucania opalisans (Draudt, 1924)
 Leucania oregona Smith, 1902
 Leucania palaestinae (Staudinger, 1897)
 Leucania paraxysta Meyrick, 1929
 Leucania patrizii (Berio, 1935)
 Leucania pectinata (Hampson, 1905)
 Leucania percussa Butler, 1880
 Leucania persecta (Hampson, 1905)
 Leucania perstriata (Hampson, 1909)
 Leucania perstrigata (Dyar, 1910)
 Leucania petra Hreblay & Yoshimatsu, 1999
 Leucania phaea Hampson, 1902
 Leucania phaeochroa (Hampson, 1905)
 Leucania phaeoneura Hampson, 1913
 Leucania phragmitidicola Guenée, 1852 – phragmites wainscot
 (Leucania phragmatidicola Guenée, 1852, misspelling)
 Leucania pilipalpis (Grote, 1876)
 Leucania polemusa Swinhoe, 1885
 Leucania polyrabda (Hampson, 1905)
 Leucania polysticha Turner, 1902
 Leucania polystrota (Hampson, 1905)
 Leucania porphyrodes (Turner, 1911)
 Leucania praetexta Townsend, 1956
 Leucania pseudargyria Guenée, 1852
 Leucania pseudoyu (Rothschild, 1915)
 Leucania ptyonophora (Hampson, 1905)
 Leucania punctosa (Treitschke, 1825)
 Leucania punctulata Wallengren, 1856
 Leucania putrescens (Hübner, [1824])
 Leucania pyrastis (Hampson, 1905)
 Leucania quadricuspidata Wallengren, 1856
 Leucania respersa Berio, 1974
 Leucania reticulata Berio, 1962
 Leucania rhabdophora Hampson, 1902
 Leucania rhodopsara (Turner, 1911)
 Leucania rhodoptera (Hampson, 1905)
 Leucania rivorum Guenée, 1852
 Leucania rosea Möschler, 1880
 Leucania roseilinea Walker, 1862
 Leucania roseilineoides Poole, 1989
 Leucania roseivena (Draudt, 1924)
 Leucania rosengreeni Rebel, 1907
 Leucania roseorufa (de Joannis, 1928)
 Leucania rosescens (Hampson, 1910)
 Leucania rubra (Hampson, 1905)
 Leucania rubrescens (Hampson, 1905)
 Leucania rufescenoides Poole, 1989
 Leucania rufidefinita (Hampson, 1918)
 Leucania sanguinis Berio, 1962
 Leucania sarca Hampson, 1902
 Leucania sarcistis (Hampson, 1905)
 Leucania sarcophaea (Hampson, 1905)
 Leucania sarcostriga (Hampson, 1905)
 Leucania scirpicola Guenée, 1852
 Leucania secta Herrich-Schäffer, 1868
 Leucania semiusta Hampson, 1891
 Leucania senescens Möschler, 1890
 Leucania separata (Walker, 1865) see Mythimna separata
 Leucania sericea (Warren, 1915)
 Leucania seteci (Dyar, 1914)
 Leucania simillima Walker, 1862
 Leucania socorrensis (Dognin, 1911)
 Leucania steniptera (Hampson, 1905)
 Leucania stenographa Lower, 1900
 Leucania stolata Smith, 1894
 Leucania striata Leech, 1900
 Leucania strigata Maassen, 1890
 Leucania striguscula (Dyar, 1913)
 Leucania subacrapex (Berio, 1970)
 Leucania subdecora (Wileman, 1912)
 Leucania subpunctata (Harvey, 1875)
 Leucania subrubrescens (Warren, 1915)
 Leucania subspurcata Walker, 1866
 Leucania suffusoides Poole, 1989
 Leucania tacuna Felder & Rogenhofer, 1874
 Leucania tenebra (Hampson, 1905)
 Leucania tritonia (Hampson, 1905)
 Leucania uda Guenée, 1852
 Leucania uniformis Moore, 1881
 Leucania ursula (Forbes, 1936)
 Leucania ustata (Hampson, 1907)
 Leucania vana (Swinhoe, 1885)
 Leucania velva (Schaus, 1921)
 Leucania venalba Moore, 1867
 Leucania vibicosa (Turner, 1920)
 Leucania vyndhiae Hreblay & Legrain, 1999
 Leucania yu Guenée, 1852
 Leucania yunnana Chen, 1999
 Leucania zeae (Duponchel, 1827)

References

 
 

 
Mythimnini